Rock Band Reloaded is a video game for iOS. It was first released in 2010 and is the successor to Rock Band on iOS. It comes with over 30 songs and a 20+ DLC list. It received mostly positive reviews. Gameplay is similar to other Rock Band series games, but controlled without instrument controllers, and instead with the iOS-device's multi-touch display, microphone and built-in accelerometer. The game features multiplayer support over Bluetooth and local wifi.

Gameplay
Rock Band Reloaded uses many gameplay features found in previous games. As before, the player has a choice between Guitar, Bass, Drums, and Vocals on four different difficulties (Easy, Normal, Hard and Expert). Main gameplay includes hitting scrolling notes as they come toward the player. In addition to the standard quickplay, the game has a tour mode as well, allowing the player to venture from city to city and perform concerts. However, unlike its predecessor, Rock Band Reloaded comes with a new vocal recognition mode, effectively duplicating the microphone found in console versions of the game. The game also features a multiplayer mode, and the ability to connect with Facebook to see your friends' scores and post achievements.

Soundtrack

Included Playlist

Free Downloads

Premium Downloads

Result of EA's licensing agreement with Harmonix ending
"EA's licensing agreement with Harmonix ended and as a result, EA discontinued downloads of Rock Band iOS and Rock Band Reloaded iOS on the App Store. If you own a Rock Band game on your iOS device, you can play it, but you cannot purchase new songs after July 31, 2012. You can access your previously purchased songs."

Reception
Rock Band Reloaded received mostly positive reviews, scoring a 7.5 on IGN.

External links
 http://www.rockband.com/games/iphone
 http://www.rockband.com/games/ipad

References

 

2010 video games
Rock Band series
IOS-only games
IOS games
Video games developed in the United States